Iranada turcorum is a moth of the family Noctuidae first described by Hans Zerny in 1915. It is found in Syria, Lebanon, Israel, Jordan, Egypt, Iraq, Oman and south-western Iran.

There is one generation per year. Adults are on wing from March to April.

External links

Image

Calpinae
Moths described in 1915
Moths of the Middle East
Taxa named by Hans Zerny